An updraft carburetor is a type of carburetor (a component of engines that mixes air and fuel together) in which the air enters at the bottom and exits at the top to go to the engine. An updraft carburetor was the first type of carburetor in common use.

In an updraft carburetor the air flows upward into the venturi according to Edward Abdo in Power Equipment Engine Technology. Other types are downdraft and sidedraft carburetors.

An updraft carburetor may need a drip collector.

See also
Pressure carburetor
Fuel injection

References

External links
Updraft Carburetor diagram in Agricultural Mechanics: Fundamentals & Applications By Ray V Herren

Carburettors